Folorunso is a given name and surname.

Notable people with the given name include:
Folorunso Alakija (born 1951), Nigerian billionaire businesswoman
Folorunso Fatukasi (born 1995), American football player

Notable people with the surname include:
Ayomide Folorunso (born 1996), Nigerian-born Italian athlete